Dmitri Sergeyevich Milchakov (born March 2, 1986) is a Belarusian professional ice hockey goaltender who is currently playing for  HC Dinamo Minsk in the Kontinental Hockey League.

He participated at the 2008 and 2011 IIHF World Championships as a member of the Belarus men's national ice hockey team.

External links

1986 births
Ice hockey people from Minsk
Belarusian ice hockey goaltenders
Living people
HC Dinamo Minsk players
HK Brest players
HK Vitebsk players
Metallurg Zhlobin players
Yunost Minsk players